Vsevolod Kashkin (born 8 June 1998) is a Russian luger. He won the gold medal in the team relay event at the 2021 FIL European Luge Championships held in Sigulda, Latvia.

In 2016, he won the bronze medal in the doubles event at the Winter Youth Olympics held in Lillehammer, Norway. He also won the silver medal in the team relay event.

At the beginning of Russia's invasion of Ukraine in late February 2022, Kashkin participated in spreading lies and Russian propaganda on social media to justify the illegal war.

References

External links 
 
 

1998 births
Living people
Place of birth missing (living people)
Russian male lugers
Lugers at the 2016 Winter Youth Olympics
20th-century Russian people
21st-century Russian people